Ernest Agyiri (born 6 March 1998) is a Ghanaian professional footballer who plays as a midfielder for Estonian Meistriliiga club  FCI Levadia.

Career

Club
Agyiri won a scholarship to the Right to Dream Academy in 2008, moving to Manchester City at the beginning of 2015.
On 31 August 2016, Agyiri was loaned to Vålerenga, by Manchester City.

On 30 August 2018, Agyiri joined Belgian side Tubize on loan.
 
In July 2020, Agyiri was released by Manchester City, after five years associated with the club.

FCI Levadia
On 29 January 2021, Agyiri signed a two-year contract with Estonian club FCI Levadia. He made his debut in the Meistriliiga on 13 March 2021, scoring two goals in a 5–0 win against Vaprus.

Career statistics

Club

References

External links

1996 births
Living people
Ghanaian footballers
Ghanaian expatriate footballers
Ghanaian expatriate sportspeople in Norway
Expatriate footballers in Norway
Expatriate footballers in Belgium
Expatriate footballers in Cyprus
Expatriate footballers in Estonia
Manchester City F.C. players
Vålerenga Fotball players
A.F.C. Tubize players
Enosis Neon Paralimni FC players
FCI Levadia Tallinn players
Eliteserien players
Challenger Pro League players
Cypriot First Division players
Meistriliiga players
Association football midfielders
Ghanaian expatriate sportspeople in Belgium
Ghanaian expatriate sportspeople in Cyprus
Ghanaian expatriate sportspeople in Estonia